Iceland's first ambassador to China was Sigurður Bjarnason in 1973. Iceland's current ambassador to China is Stefán Skjaldarson.

List of ambassadors

See also
China–Iceland relations
Foreign relations of Iceland
Ambassadors of Iceland

References
List of Icelandic representatives (Icelandic Foreign Ministry website) 

Main
China
Iceland